is a Japanese four-panel manga series written and illustrated by Itokichi. It has been serialized in Media Factory's Monthly Comic Gene magazine since 2011 and the chapters have collected into eight tankōbon volumes. An anime television series adaptation by Asahi Production aired from October to December 2014.

Plot
The four-panel manga begins with Tatsumi, a high-school boy who lives by himself. Then, a devastatingly handsome merman named Wakasa moves into the bathtub in Tatsumi's home. Wakasa is a bit self-centered but cute, while Tatsumi is cool but a busybody. The manga offers a peek into their lives together.

Characters

 
 Tatsumi is a high school student who found Wakasa drying out by a river and took him in, thinking he was hurt.  He was shocked to find out he was a merman, but decided to let him stay in his bathtub.  While usually cool and shy, he's gotten used to living with Wakasa and all his other friends.

 
 Wakasa is a merman, who was originally living in a heavily polluted river by the upstream dam. As it became too troublesome to live in that area, since rumors about mermaid sighting had started to go around, he decided he had to leave this place and was soon found stranded by Tatsumi, who invited him to live in his comfortable, clean bathroom.

 
 Takasu is an octopus merman who likes to check on Wakasa, and the two of them seem to have been friends from before Tatsumi met Wakasa. Takasu likes climbing into small spaces like Tatsumi's washing machine.

 
 Tatsumi's little sister. She loves her brother a lot and considers Wakasa her rival for Tatsumi's affection.

 
 A jellyfish merman who can split himself into many smaller versions and administer electric shocks. He has an easygoing personality and has wanderlust so he tends to move around a lot.

 
 Maki is a sea snail merman who Tatsumi saved from some bullying children. Maki normally has a self-deprecating, negative personality, but a little kindness brings out a bright, happy snail from his (literal and figurative) shell.

 Agari is a big shark merman rumored to be the model for the movie Jaws. He is referred to as "senpai" (an older person, usually of higher rank or just deeply respected by the person using this term) by Wakasa because sharks are the top among the fish. Although Agari looks scary, he is actually rather shy. He hides underneath the water with only his fin visible because he is too nervous to speak, mainly because he often ends up scaring people when he opens his mouth and flashes his many sharp teeth. Therefore, he uses body language to communicate instead.

 A starfish merman, who is a younger acquaintance of Wakasa. He likes children and has a really sticky body.

 A friend and classmate of Tatsumi. He does not know that his friend is living with a merman.

 
 A rubber duck that stands in the bathroom of Tatsumi's home. It also serves as a narrator role in the anime.

Media

Manga
The individual chapters were collected into eight tankōbon volumes published by Kadokawa Shoten.

Volume list

Anime
An anime television series adaptation by Asahi Production aired from October 6 to December 29, 2014. The series is directed by Sayo Aoi and written by Yuniko Ayana, with character designs by Koji Haneda. The series was obtained by Crunchyroll for streaming in North America and other select parts of the world. Medialink licensed the series in Asia-Pacific.

Episode list

Television drama
A 14-episode live-action television series adaptation titled, 49 Days With a Merman premiered February 6, 2022 on KKTV Taiwan streaming service. It was the first self-produced drama by MediaLink. The series was directed by Hsi-ming Chang, and stars Bruce Hung, Kent Tsai and Liu Chu-Ping.

References

External links
Anime Official Website 

Anime series based on manga
Asahi Production
Comedy anime and manga
Fictional mermen and mermaids
Kadokawa Dwango franchises
Media Factory manga
Medialink
Seven Seas Entertainment titles
Shōjo manga
Yonkoma
Slice of life anime and manga